Ostrowiec Świętokrzyski, often referred to as Ostrowiec, is a city in southeastern Poland, in the historical region of Lesser Poland, with 66,258 residents (as of 2021). The town is one of historic centers of Polish industry and metallurgy, and was part of the Old-Polish Industrial Region, the oldest industrial basin of the country.

Ostrowiec is the capital city of Ostrowiec Świętokrzyski County, part of Świętokrzyskie Voivodeship (since 1999), previously it belonged to Kielce Voivodeship (1975–1998). It received town charter in 1613.

Ostrowiec lies on the Kamienna river. Its northern districts are located in the Iłża Foothills, while southern part belongs to the Opatów Upland. Świętokrzyskie Mountains lie a few kilometers away, southwest of Ostrowiec. There are two interesting places near Ostrowiec: the archaeological reserve at Krzemionki (a UNESCO World Heritage Site and Historic Monument of Poland) and dinosaur park in Bałtów.

Ostrowiec is located at the intersection of National Road No. 9 (part of European route E371), and local roads 751, 754, 755. Furthermore, since 1884 the town has had a rail connection, along electrified rail line No. 25, which goes from Łódź Kaliska to Dębica. In the 1960s, Polish government planned construction of a rail line from Kielce to Lublin via Ostrowiec. The area of the town is 46 km2, and it is divided into 20 osiedla.

History

Early history

The oldest testimonies of human habitation date back to the Stone Age (ca 4000 BC). At that time, there were nomadic tribes belonging to, among others, the Lengyel and Globular Amphora cultures. They came here from Danube river region.

The earliest documents about Ostrowiec village, that gave beginning to the contemporary Ostrowiec Świętokrzyski come from 14th century. At that time the village was called Ostrow, and was located on the right bank of the Kamienna. In the early 16th century, a local nobleman Kacper Maciejewski tried to establish here a town, but failed to do so. In 1564 town charter was granted to the settlement of Denków (also called Wielki Michów), which is now one of the Ostrowiec districts. Denków was a private town, administratively located in the Sandomierz County in the Sandomierz Voivodeship in the Lesser Poland Province of the Polish Crown.

The city itself, at that time part of Sandomierz Voivodeship, was built from scratch in 1597 by Jakub Gawroński of Rawa coat of arms on the left bank of the Kamienna river, situated in the Vistula river basin. It received town privileges in 1613. It became a property of Janusz Ostrogski, a statesman and one of the richest magnates of the Polish–Lithuanian Commonwealth. Later it belonged to many Polish aristocratic families: Tarnowski family, Czartoryski family, Lubomirski family, Radziwiłł family, Zasławski family, Sanguszko family, Wielopolski family, Dobrzański family, Łubieński family.

Industrialisation

In the late 18th and early 19th centuries, Ostrowiec emerged as a main center of Polish industry. Following the idea of Stanisław Staszic, who promoted industrialization of the Kamienna river valley, based on local deposits of coal and iron ore, numerous plants were opened in the area. In 1837 - 1839, the Klimkiewicz Steelworks was opened (named after its founder Antoni Klimkiewicz), which later came to be known as the Ostrowiec Works (Zaklady Ostrowieckie). The plant became the second largest in Congress Poland, and in its vicinity, various enterprises were opened, together with workers establishment.

Ostrowiec was one of main centers of the Revolution in the Kingdom of Poland (1905–1907). On 27 December 1905 the so-called Ostrowiec Republic was established, and for two weeks, the town and the county were ruled by the Polish Socialist Party, headed by Ignacy Boerner. The Republic was ended after the arrival of two infantry regiments of the Imperial Russian Army. The Ostrowiec Works was severely damaged during World War I, and on 3 November 1918 newly-established Polish authorities took control over Ostrowiec. In the Second Polish Republic Ostrowiec developed, due to its location in Central Industrial Area. The town belonged to Opatow County, and before World War II its population was app. 30,000. In 1937 it was officially named Ostrowiec Swietokrzyski. Earlier on, the names Ostrowiec Kielecki and Ostrowiec nad Kamienna had been used.

World War II

During the German invasion of Poland, which started World War II, the Wehrmacht captured the town on 8 September 1939. Afterwards it was occupied by Germany and included within the Radom District of the General Government, formed of German-occupied central Poland. In 1940 the Germans carried out mass arrests of Poles as part of the AB-Aktion. Poles arrested in March were either deported to Nazi concentration camps or massacred in Góry Wysokie, while those arrested in June were imprisoned and tortured in Skarżysko-Kamienna and then murdered in a forest near Skarżysko-Kamienna. Germans carried out several executions and massacres in the town. On 30 September 1942, 29 Poles, including merchants, teachers and local officials, were hanged at the Market Square. In 1944, the Germans poured corrosive substances into their mass grave in attempt to cover up the crime. Most of the town's Jewish community of app. 11,000 was murdered in the Holocaust in 1943–1944.

Ostrowiec was a lively centre of the Polish resistance movement. There was underground weapons production. Independent underground Polish press printed in nearby Sandomierz was distributed in Ostrowiec since 1940. A very significant action carried out by the local Polish underground was the kidnapping of the German city commissioner Bruno Motschall. In 1943, Motschall was kidnapped in broad daylight in the town center by a Home Army unit in his own car. The Poles fled towards the nearby village of Chmielów. A German pursuit group of 60 people followed the car. Because of a car defect, the kidnappers were caught up in Chmielów, where a shootout ensued, which resulted in three Poles being killed. German troops withdraw westwards on 16 January 1945.

Recent period
Ostrowiec continued its development in the postwar period. In 1954, several villages were annexed, including Denków, which itself had once been a town. In the 1970s, a new metallurgical plant was opened. In the 1990s, the metallurgical industry experienced a big crisis. The steel plant was bought then by Spanish CELSA Group.

Points of interest 

 Collegiate church of Michael the Archangel (early 17th century, remodelled in neo-Baroque style in 1924-1938),
 St. Stanislaus church in Denków (1700, with an 1806 bell tower),
 Wielopolski family park and palace in the district of Czestocice (1887-1899), now housing the Historic-Archeological Museum
 Wielopolski family hunting palace, now a hotel
 Mountain style wooden church (1932),
 Remnants of a Jewish cemetery on a park hill, 
 Late 19th century rail station,
 Post office (1925-1927),
 St. Florian roadside figure at St. Florian square (1776).
 Krzemionki Prehistoric Striped Flint Mining Region, a UNESCO World Heritage Site and Historic Monument of Poland, is located about eight kilometers north-east of the city

Culture 
Inhabitants of Ostrowiec are known to be involved in many culture and arts activities. The town has a variety of cultural institutions including:
 Municipal Cultural Centre
 Office of Artistic Exhibitions
 The Museum of History and Anthropology with a forest reserve in Krzemionki
 Public Library – has locations in different parts of the town
 Houses of Culture – children can get involved in the dance classes, drama classes, classes of art and modelling etc.; literature and general knowledge competitions are also organized.

Ostrowiec Świętokrzyski also boasts a musical school and the State Artistic Centre, both of which have had an important influence upon the cultural development of the town.

Education 

 Wyższa Szkoła Biznesu i Przedsiębiorczości (College of Business and Entrepreneurship in Ostrowiec Świętokrzyski)
 Catholic High School http://www.klo.ostrowiec.pl

Sports 

 KSZO Ostrowiec Świętokrzyski - football team
 KSZO Ostrowiec Świętokrzyski - handball team

Notable people 
 Ben Berger (born 1897), Owner of the Minnesota Lakers (later Los Angeles Lakers)
Mirosław Baka (born 1963), Polish actor
 Agnieszka Gablewska, Best Teacher of Poland in 2006
 Meir Yechiel Halstock (1852–1928), Hassidic rabbi
 Andrzej Kobylański (born 1970), former Polish footballer
 Włodek Pawlik (born 1958), Polish composer and jazz pianist, Grammy Award winner
 Jan Piwnik (1912–1944), Polish soldier, notable member of the Polish resistance movement against the German occupation of Poland during World War II
 Jan Rybkowski (1912–1987), Polish film director and screenwriter
 Magdalena Swat (born 1991), Miss Universe Poland 2018
 Grzegorz Szymański (born 1978), Polish volleyball player
 Jerzy Tracz (born 1943), Polish Olympic swimmer
 Agnieszka Warchulska (born 1972), Polish actress

International relations

Twin towns — Sister cities
Ostrowiec Świętokrzyski is twinned with the following cities:

References

External links 

 
 Our City - News & Info

Cities and towns in Świętokrzyskie Voivodeship
Ostrowiec County
Sandomierz Voivodeship
Radom Governorate
Kielce Voivodeship (1919–1939)
Holocaust locations in Poland
Archaeological sites in Poland
Lengyel culture
Globular Amphora culture